The 5th constituency of the Rhône (French: Cinquième circonscription du Rhône) is a French legislative constituency in the Rhône département. Like the other 576 French constituencies, it elects one MP using a two round electoral system.

Description

The 5th constituency of the Rhône lies to the north east of Lyon. The seat includes the town of Caluire-et-Cuire a suburb of the city as well as Neuville-sur-Saône further to the north on the Saône river.

Until 2017 the voters in the 5th had consistently supported candidates from the centre right when it fell to the En Marche! coalition along with all but two seats in the whole of the Rhône.

Assembly Members

Election results

2022

 
 
 
 
|-
| colspan="8" bgcolor="#E9E9E9"|
|-

2017

 
 
 
 
 
|-
| colspan="8" bgcolor="#E9E9E9"|
|-

2012

 
 
 
 
 
|-
| colspan="8" bgcolor="#E9E9E9"|
|-

2007

 
 
 
 
 
 
|-
| colspan="8" bgcolor="#E9E9E9"|
|-

2002

 
 
 
 
 
 
 
|-
| colspan="8" bgcolor="#E9E9E9"|
|-

1997

 
 
 
 
 
 
 
 
 
|-
| colspan="8" bgcolor="#E9E9E9"|
|-
 
 

 
 
 
 
 

* UDF dissident

References

5